The 1st Field Artillery Regiment (Mountain) is a field artillery regiment of the Italian Army, specializing in mountain combat. The regiment was raised in 1887 as Mountain Artillery Regiment to support the Italian Army's mountain infantry troops, the Alpini, with whom the regiment shares the distinctive Cappello Alpino. Both, the Alpini and the Mountain Artillery, distinguished themselves in World War I and World War II. The Gold Medal of Military Valour affixed to the regiment's war flag and displayed on the regiment's coat of arms was originally awarded to the Mountain Artillery Group "Aosta" for its service with the Partisan Division "Garibaldi" in Montenegro. Today the regiment is based in Fossano in Piedmont and operationally assigned to the Alpine Brigade "Taurinense".

History 
The unit was raised in the city of Turin on 1 November 1887 as Mountain Artillery Regiment with three artillery brigades of three batteries each. On 1 March 1895 the unit expanded to five brigades, with the V Brigade becoming autonomous as Mountain Artillery Brigade of the Veneto on 21 August 1902. The regiment was tasked to provide artillery support to the 1st, 2nd, 3rd, and 4th Alpini regiments and recruited in Piedmont, Liguria and Aosta. By July 1909 the regiment consisted of the:
 Brigade "Oneglia", in Oneglia (tasked to support the 1st Alpini Regiment)
 Brigade "Mondovì", in Mondovì (tasked to support the 2nd Alpini Regiment)
 Brigade "Torino-Susa", in Turin (tasked to support the 3rd Alpini Regiment)
 Brigade "Torino-Aosta", in Turin (tasked to support the 4th Alpini Regiment)

On 17 July 1910 the brigades were renamed as groups.

World War 1

With tensions rising the army expanded the mountain artillery and on 1 February 1915 the regiment transferred the depot in Oneglia with the Mountain Artillery Group "Oneglia" to the newly formed 3rd Mountain Artillery Regiment. Along with the depot and group, recruitment in Liguria and the task to support the 1st Alpini Regiment passed to the new regiment. To compensate for the loss of the "Oneglia" Group on the same date the Mountain Artillery Group "Torino-Pinerolo" was raised in Turin.

During the war the regiment's depots raised and trained the commands of nine mountain artillery groupings, the commands of 17 mountain artillery groups, and 37 mountain artillery batteries, which were each equipped with four 65/17 mod. 13 cannons. Furthermore, two commands of siege groups, and 14 siege batteries were raised and trained by the regiment.

 The regiment raised the following mountain artillery groupings: 1°, 2°, 3°, 4°, 5°, 9°, 10°, 11°, and 12°.
 The regiment raised the following mountain artillery groups: XV (66th, 67th, 68th bty.), XIX (14th, 51st, 55th bty.), XXII (47th, 48th, 49th bty.), XXV (82nd, 83rd, 84th bty.), XXIX (91st, 92nd, 93rd bty.), XXXIII, XXXIV, XXXV, XXXVII, XXXVIII, XXXIX, XLIII, XLIV, LII, LVIII, LXII, and LXV.

Note 1: The group's 53rd Mountain Artillery Battery was not raised until November 1916 for lack of available 65/17 mod. 13 cannons.

Current Structure

As of 2022 the 1st Field Artillery Regiment (Mountain) consists of:

  Regimental Command, in Fossano
  Command and Logistic Support Battery
  7th Surveillance, Target Acquisition and Tactical Liaison Battery "Susa’d fer"
  Artillery Group "Aosta"
  4th Howitzer Battery "La pomonite"
  5th Howitzer Battery "La fulmine"
  40th Howitzer Battery
  6th Fire and Technical Support Battery "La Garibaldi"

The Command and Logistic Support Battery fields the following sections: C3 Section, Transport and Materiel Section, Medical Section, and Commissariat Section. The regiment is equipped with FH-70 towed howitzers and an unknown number of M56 105mm pack howitzers in the direct fire role. The 7th Surveillance, Target Acquisition and Tactical Liaison Battery is equipped with RQ-11B Raven unmanned aerial vehicles and ARTHUR counter-battery radars.

See also 
 Alpine Brigade "Taurinense"

External links
Italian Army Website: 1° Reggimento Artiglieria Terrestre (montagna)

References

Regiments of Italy in World War I
Regiments of Italy in World War II
Artillery Regiments of Italy
Military units and formations established in 1887
Military units and formations disestablished in 1943
Military units and formations established in 1991
1991 establishments in Italy
1887 establishments in Italy